Reyhanabad (also Romanized as Reyḩānābād) is a village in Bakeshluchay Rural District of the Central District of Urmia County, West Azerbaijan province, Iran. At the 2006 National Census, its population was 6,125 in 1,530 households. The following census in 2011 counted 8,497 people in 2,371 households. The latest census in 2016 showed a population of 10,536 people in 2,992 households; it was the largest village in its rural district.

See also
 Assyrians in Iran
 List of Assyrian settlements

References 

Urmia County

Populated places in West Azerbaijan Province

Populated places in Urmia County

Assyrian settlements